Laser Graffiti is the debut studio album by the Australian rock group The Galvatrons. Originally due for release in April 2009, the release date was pushed back to 3 July 2009. It is the first new material from the band since their When We Were Kids EP, released in early 2008.

Track listing
 "And So They Invade..." – 1:12
 "The First Starfighter" – 3:52
 "Cassandra" – 3:26
 "We Were Kids" – 3:56
 "Robots Are Cool" – 3:55
 "Laser Graffiti" – 3:27
 "Light Speed" – 3:25
 "Stella" – 3:35
 "She's in Love" – 3:43
 "Molotov Cocktail" – 4:15
 "Galaxy Destroyer" – 4:32

iTunes Australia bonus tracks
 "Cassandra" (acoustic version) – 3:14
 "X-Ray Spex" – 3:41

Personnel
Johnny "Galvatron" – lead vocals, guitar
Robert Convery "Bozza" – drums, percussion
Pete "Gamma" – keyboard, backing vocals
Pete Convery "Condor" – bass, backing vocals

Charts

References

External links
Thegalvatrons.com.au

2009 debut albums
The Galvatrons albums